Steven Cole (born 18 March 1982, in Liverpool) is a British actor best known for his portrayal of Leo Johnson in the Channel 4 Soap opera Brookside from 1996 to 2001.

He joined HBO's Game of Thrones during its second season to play the Dothraki Kovarro.

References

External links
 

Black British male actors
1982 births
Living people
Male actors from Liverpool
English male child actors
English male soap opera actors
English people of Igbo descent